Stigmatomma mulanae is a species of ant of the genus Stigmatomma. Described by Xu in 2000 from a single dealate queen found in 1998 in the Xishuangbanna Nature Reserve in Yunnan Province, it was placed as the type species of Bannapone, under the name Bannapone mulanae. It was moved to Stigmatomma by Ward & Fisher (2016).

References

Amblyoponinae
Insects of China
Insects described in 2000